The High Sheriff of the East Riding of Yorkshire is a current High Sheriff title which has existed since 1996. For around 1,000 years the entire area of Yorkshire was covered by a single High Sheriff of Yorkshire. After the Local Government Act 1972 the title was split to cover several newly created counties. Most of the former area of the East Riding became part of the county of Humberside and under the High Sheriff of Humberside title. Humberside was abolished in 1996 and a High Sheriff title was created for the newly reconstituted East Riding of Yorkshire.

Below is a list of the sheriffs.

List of High Sheriffs

References

External links
HighSheriffs.com
High Sheriffs of the East Riding of Yorkshire

East Riding of Yorkshire
East Riding of Yorkshire
High Sheriff